Cocody is a suburb of and one of the 10 urban communes of Abidjan, Ivory Coast. It is upmarket and has an abundance of mansions. Cocody is where most of the wealthy businesspeople, ambassadors, and other affluent people live in Abidjan. The Université Félix Houphouët-Boigny is located in Cocody.

Education
Schools:
Jean-Mermoz International School
École la Farandole Internationale Abidjan
École Nid de Cocody

In popular culture
In 1965 a film was released entitled Man from Cocody.

Alpha Blondy wrote a song about Cocody, titled Cocody Rock.

References

Communes of Abidjan
Suburbs in Ivory Coast